, better known by his stage name  (born April 17, 1954), is a Japanese stage actor and voice actor from Gifu. He is a graduate of the Fine Arts department of Nihon University. Imamura began his career in the musical troupe Musical Company It's Follies and was coached by Nachi Nozawa.

Imamura tattoos himself as a hobby and has reportedly spent 4 to 5 million yen (the equivalent of $45,000 to $56,000) on tattoos over the course of a decade. From April 26 to June 7, 2010, Imamura posted pictures of his lower body on his blog with the intention of showing that his body had been completely tattooed. Imamura was arrested in July 2010 for posting images that were deemed indecent. This event forced Imamura to step down from his ongoing voice role as Emporio Ivankov in One Piece (the role was subsequently inherited by Mitsuo Iwata). On September 1, Imamura was released following a summary proceeding at the Tokyo Public Prosecutor's Office and was given a fine of 500,000 yen (approximately $6,000).

Roles

Television animation
One Piece (Emporio Ivankov (first voice))
Transformers: Robots in Disguise (Gas Skunk)

Dubbing roles
The Birdcage (Video/DVD edition) (Albert Goldman)
The Next Best Thing
Wasabi

Stage
Chotto Nozo Itemitegoran
Gotsugōshugi de Gyō Kō
Charlie's Hengel
Gotsugōshugi de Gyō Kō, Part 2: Heppiri Koshi de Gyō Kō
Sammy's Bar Heyōkoso!
Chotto Nozo Itemitegoran 2008
Bakumatsu Samurai Densetsu -CHUJI-
21-Seiki Chūnen! ~Saishūshō: Wagashi no On?~

References

External links
Sheneo Blog

1954 births
Japanese male stage actors
Japanese male voice actors
Living people
Male voice actors from Gifu Prefecture
Male actors from Gifu Prefecture
Japanese LGBT actors
People from Gifu